Tony Mayes (born May 19, 1964) is a former American football defensive back. He played for the St. Louis Cardinals in 1987.

References

1964 births
Living people
People from Claiborne County, Tennessee
Players of American football from Tennessee
Players of American football from Kentucky
American football defensive backs
Kentucky Wildcats football players
St. Louis Cardinals (football) players